This is a list of lighthouses in Chile from Chacao Channel to Dalcahue Channel.

Chacao Channel

Reloncaví Sound

Reloncaví Estuary

Gulf of Ancud

Dalcahue Channel

See also
List of fjords, channels, sounds and straits of Chile
List of islands of Chile

References
  List of Lights, Radio Aids and Fog Signals: The West Coast of North and South America... National Geospatial-Intelligence Agency. 2013. pp. 20–60.

NGA1544-NGA1816
NGA1544-NGA1816
Lighthouses NGA1544-NGA1816